Edward A Rooney (Circa 1880 – Circa 1950) was an Irish first-class cricketer.

Rooney was born at County Meath sometime prior to 1880. A civil servant with the Irish Land Commission, Rooney played his club cricket for the Land Commission associated Merrion, as well as playing for Pembroke. He made two appearances in first-class cricket for Ireland against Scotland at Edinburgh in 1913. He made a second first-class appearance against Scotland the following year at Dublin. He scored 34 runs across his two matches, with a highest score of 12 not out. He did not feature for Ireland again. He later rose to the position of Acting Assistant Director in the Land Commission.

References

External links

1880s births
1950 deaths
Sportspeople from County Meath
Irish cricketers
Irish civil servants